Victoria University Secondary College is a state government co-educational day school for years 7-12. The junior campus is located in Deer Park, Victoria, Australia. The senior campus is  located in St. Albans, Victoria, Australia. The college was founded in 2010, by the amalgamation of two secondary schools: Brimbank Secondary College (formerly Jamieson Park Secondary College & prior to that St Albans Technical School) and Deer Park Secondary College (formerly Deer Park High School), and then, in 2011, Kealba Secondary College (formerly Kealba High School).

It currently consists of two 7-12 campuses in St. Albans and Deer Park, however a new senior campus is currently under construction at Cairnlea, Victoria where it will cater for students from year 10-12. The Brimbank Campus is planned to close.

The school allows students opportunities to undertake a variety of courses of study: VET, VCAL, VCE and university extension.

Personnel
College Principal:            Elaine Hazim
Brimbank Campus Principal:    Sue Atzarakis
Deer Park Campus Principal: Glenn Leyland

Extracurricular activities

Extracurricular options available to students include debating, drama, environmental club, instrumental music, musical productions, student leadership and a number of lunchtime and after-school clubs. Students are also able to join in many sport teams, including volleyball, badminton, basketball, soccer, softball, football, rugby, swimming, table tennis, athletics and netball.

External links
 Victoria University Secondary College website

References

Public high schools in Melbourne
Educational institutions established in 2010
2010 establishments in Australia